Stemming from a business started in 1988, Proper Music Distribution has grown to become the largest totally independent distributor in the UK, with annual sales of over £25million. It is a wholly owned subsidiary company of Proper Music Group Limited. In recent years it has been a frequent winner of coveted Music Week Awards.   "Music Week – Best Distribution Team" and Diversity In The Workplace.  In 2017, the company relocated to a new, purpose built 100,000sq. ft. distribution centre in Dartford, Kent.

In January 2022, it was announced the Switzerland-headquartered fintech company, Utopia Music, had acquired Proper Music Distribution's parent company, Proper Music Group.

Distributed artists
A tiny selection from thousands of distributed artists include:
Aimee Mann
Amy LaVere
Beth Neilsen Chapman
Bird in the Belly
Cara Dillon
Daughter
Dr John
Eliza Carthy
Joan Baez
Martin Carthy
Nick Cave
Nick Lowe
Oysterband
Paul Carrack
Pet Shop Boys
Richard Thompson
Travis

Distributed record labels
A small selection of distributed labels include:
Alligator Records
Big Chill
Crammed Discs
ECM Records
Far Out Recordings
Fellside Records
Fledg'ling
The Last Music Company
MiG-music
Naim Records
Navigator Records
Ploughboy Records
Proper Records
Real World Records
Ruf Records
Sain
Shanachie Records
Soundway Records
Stoney Plain Records
Topic Records
Whirlwind Records

References

External links 

 

British record labels
Record label distributors